HMS Griffin was a 28-gun Coventry-class sixth-rate frigate of the Royal Navy.

Construction 
Griffin was an oak-built 28-gun sixth-rate, one of 18 vessels forming part of the Coventry-class of frigates. Admiralty contracts for Griffins construction were issued to commercial shipwright Moody Janverin of Bursledon on 16 May 1757, with a stipulation that work be completed within twelve months. Her keel was laid down in June 1757 but work proceeded slowly and the vessel was not launched until 18 October 1758. On 26 October she was sailed to the Royal Navy dockyard at Portsmouth where she was armed and supplied for service at sea.

Her armament comprised 24 nine-pounder cannons located along her gun deck, supported by four three-pounder cannons on the quarterdeck and twelve -pounder swivel guns ranged along her sides. Her crewing complement was 200 officers and men.

The frigate was named after the griffin, a legendary creature with the body, tail, and back legs of a lion, the head and wings of an eagle, and an eagle's talons as its front feet. The choice of name followed a trend initiated in 1748 by John Montagu, 4th Earl of Sandwich, in his capacity as First Lord of the Admiralty, of using figures from classical antiquity as descriptors for naval vessels. A total of six Coventry-class vessels were named in this manner; a further ten were named after geographic features including regions, English or Irish rivers, or towns.

In sailing qualities Griffin was broadly comparable with French frigates of equivalent size, but with a shorter and sturdier hull and greater weight in her broadside guns. She was also comparatively broad-beamed with ample space for provisions and the ship's mess, and incorporating a large magazine for powder and round shot. Taken together, these characteristics would enable Griffin to remain at sea for long periods without resupply. She was also built with broad and heavy masts, which balanced the weight of her hull, improved stability in rough weather and made her capable of carrying a greater quantity of sail. The disadvantages of this comparatively heavy design were a decline in manoeuvrability and slower speed when sailing in light winds.

Her designated complement was 200, comprising two commissioned officers  a captain and a lieutenant  overseeing 40 warrant and petty officers, 91 naval ratings, 38 Marines and 29 servants and other ranks. Among these other ranks were four positions reserved for widow's men  fictitious crew members whose pay was intended to be reallocated to the families of sailors who died at sea.

Notes

References

Bibliography

 
 

Frigates of the Royal Navy
1758 ships
Ships built on the River Hamble
Maritime incidents in 1761